The Metre Convention, also known as the Treaty of the Metre, is an international treaty that was signed in Paris on 20 May 1875 by representatives of 17 nations: Argentina, Austria-Hungary, Belgium, Brazil, Denmark, France, Germany, Italy, Peru, Portugal, Russia, Spain, Sweden and Norway, Switzerland, Ottoman Empire, United States of America, and Venezuela.

The treaty created the International Bureau of Weights and Measures (BIPM), an intergovernmental organization, under the authority of the General Conference on Weights and Measures (CGPM) and the supervision of the International Committee for Weights and Measures (CIPM). These organizations coordinate international metrology and the development of internationally recognized systems of measurement.

The Metre Convention established a permanent organizational structure for member governments to act in common accord on all matters relating to units of measurement. The three organs of the BIPM are:

The General Conference on Weights and Measures ( or CGPM)—the plenary organ of the BIPM which consists of the delegates of all the contracting governments
The International Committee for Weights and Measures ( or CIPM)—the direction and supervision organ composed of 18 prominent metrologists from 18 different member states
The headquarters or secretariat of the BIPM at Saint-Cloud, France, which employs around 70 people and hosts BIPM's formal meetings

Initially the Metre Convention covered only units of mass and length. In 1921, at the sixth meeting of the CGPM, convention was amended to its scope to other fields in physics. In 1960, at the eleventh meeting of the CGPM, its system of units was named the International System of Units (abreviateed SI).

The Metre Convention provides that only nations can be members of the BIPM. In 1999, the CGPM created in the status of associate, to enable non-member states and economic entities can participate in some activities of the BIPM through their national metrology institutes (NMIs).

, the CGPM had 62 members and 40 associates.

Membership in the CGPM requires payment of substantial fees. Failure to pay these over a span of years has led to expulsion of some former members.

Background

Before the French Revolution, which started in 1789, French units of measurement were based on the Carolingian system, introduced by the first Holy Roman Emperor Charlemagne (800–814 AD) which in turn were based on ancient Roman measures. Charlemagne brought a consistent system of measures across the entire empire. However, after his death, the empire fragmented and many rulers introduced their own variants of the units of measure.

By the time of the revolution, the number of units of measure had grown to the extent that it was almost impossible to keep track of them.

In England in 1215, clause 25 of the Magna Carta required that the same standards of measurement be applied throughout the realm. The wording of the clause emphasized that "There is to be a single measure ... throughout our realm". Five centuries later, when in 1707 England and Scotland were united into a single kingdom, the Scots agreed to use the same units of measure that were already established in England. During the eighteenth century, in order to facilitate trade, Peter the Great, Czar of Russia adopted the English system of measure.

From 1668 to 1776 the French standard of length was the Toise of Châtelet which was fixed outside the Grand Châtelet in Paris. In 1735 two geodetic standards were calibrated against the Toise of Châtelet. One of them, the Toise of Peru was used for the French Geodesic Mission to the Equator. In 1766 the Toise of Peru became the official standard of length in France and was renamed Toise of the Academy.

Profusion of units of measures was a practical problem of importance before the French Revolution and its reform was one of the items on the agenda of National Assembly. In 1799, after the remeasurement of the Paris meridian arc between Dunkirk and Barcelona by Delambre and Mechain, the metre was defined as a quarter of a 10-millionth of the Earth circumference or 3  (French feet) and 11.296  (lines) of the Toise of the Academy. Talleyrand, an influential leader of the Assembly invited British and American participation in the establishment of a new system, but in the event, the Assembly went it alone and introduced the metre and the kilogram which were to form the basis of the metric system, manufacturing prototypes which, in 1799, were lodged with Archives.

The Helvetic Republic adopted the metric system in 1803. In 1805, a Swiss immigrant Ferdinand Rudolph Hassler brought copies of the French metre and kilogram in the United States. In 1830 the Congress decided to create uniform standards for length and weight in the United States. Hassler was mandated to work out the new standards and proposed to adopt the metric system. The United States Congress opted for the British Parliamentary Standard Yard of 1758 and the British Troy Pound of 1824 as length and weight standards. Nevertheless, the primary baseline of the U.S Coast Survey was measured in 1834 at Fire Island using four two-metre iron bars constructed after Hassler's specification in Great Britain and brought back in the United States in 1815. All distances measured in the U.S. National Geodetic Survey were referred to the metre.

Between 1840 and 1870, a number of countries definitively adopted the metric system as their system of measure including France, Spain, many South American republics and many of the Italian and German states (the Netherlands had adopted the system in 1817). In 1863, the International Postal Union used grams to express permitted weights of letters.

In 1852 the Spanish Government was urged by the Spanish Royal Academy of Sciences to approve the creation of a large-scale map of Spain. The following year Carlos Ibáñez e Ibáñez de Ibero was appointed to undertake this task. All the scientific and technical material had to be created. Carlos Ibáñez e Ibáñez de Ibero and Frutos Saavedra Meneses went to Paris to supervise the production by Brunner of a four metres long measuring instrument which they had devised and which they later compared with Borda's double-toise N°1 which was the main reference for measuring all geodetic bases in France and whose length was 3.8980732 metres.

In 1867 at the second General Conference of the International Association of Geodesy held in Berlin, the question of international standard of length was discussed in order to combine the measurements made in different countries to determine the size and shape of the earth. The conference recommended the adoption of the metric system (replacing Bessel's toise, a copy of the Toise of Peru made in 1823) and the creation of an International Metre Commission.

In the 1860s, inspections of the prototype metre revealed wear and tear at the measuring faces of the bar and also that the bar was wont to flex slightly when in use. In view of the doubts being cast on the reproducibility of the metre and the kilogram and the threat that a rival standard might be set up, Napoleon III invited scientists from all the world's nations to attend a conference in Paris. In July 1870, two weeks before the conference was due to start, the Franco-Prussian War broke out. Although the delegates did meet (without a German delegation), it was agreed that the conference should be recalled once all the delegates (including the German delegation) were present. The International Metre Commission was established in Paris.

Following the war, which resulted in Napoleon III's exile, Germany and Italy, now unified nations, adopted the metric system as their national system of units, but with the prototype copy of the kilogram and metre under the control of the Third French Republic. In 1872 the new republican government reissued the invitations and in 1875 scientists from thirty European and American countries met in Paris. This same year, the International Association of Geodesy held its General Conference in Paris and decided the creation of an international geodetic standard for baselines' measurement, calibrated against the metre.

1875 conference 
The principal tasks facing the delegates at the 1875 conference was the replacement of the existing metre and kilogram artefacts that were held by the French Government and the setting up of an organization to administer the maintenance of standards around the globe. The conference did not concern itself with other units of measure. The conference had undertones of Franco-German political manoeuvring, particularly since the French had been humiliated by the Prussians during the war a few years previously. Although France lost control of the metric system, they ensured that it passed to international rather than German control and that the international headquarters were in Paris. Spain notably supported France for this outcome and the first president of the International Committee for Weights and Measures, the Spanish geodesist, Carlos Ibáñez e Ibáñez de Ibero received the Grand Officer medal of the Légion d'Honneur for his diplomatic role on this issue and was awarded the Poncelet Prize for his scientific contribution to metrology. Indeed, as Carlos Ibáñez e Ibáñez de Ibero was collaborating with the French on the Paris meridian arc (West Europe-Africa Meridian-arc) remeasurement since 1853, and was president of both the Permanent Committee of the International Metre Commission since 1872 and the Permanent Commission of the International Association of Geodesy since 1874, he was to play a pivotal role in reconciling French and German interests.

Reference standards

The conference was called to discuss the maintenance of international standards based on the existing French standards rather than using French standards which, at that time, were 70 years old and which, through wear and tear, might not be exactly the same as when they adopted in 1799.

Prior to the 1870 conference, French politicians had feared that the world community might reject the existing metre as it was 0.03% (300 µm) shorter than its design length, ordering a new meridional measurement. They were eventually reassured when the German-born Swiss delegate Adolphe Hirsch said "no serious scientist would in our day and age contemplate a metre deduced from the size of the earth". When the conference was reconvened in 1875, it was proposed that new prototype metre and kilogram standards be manufactured to reproduce the values of the existing artifacts as closely as possible.

Although the new standard metre had the same value as the old metre, it had an "X" cross-section rather than a rectangular cross-section as this reduced the flexing when taking measurements. Moreover, the new bar, rather than being exactly one metre in length was a little longer than one metre and had lines engraved on them that were exactly one metre apart. The London firm Johnson Matthey delivered 30 prototype metres and 40 prototype kilograms. At the first meeting of the CGPM in 1889 bar No. 6 and cylinder No. X were chosen by lot as the international prototypes. The remainder were either kept as BIPM working copies or distributed by lot to member states as national prototypes.

The prototype metre was retained as the international standard until 1960 when the metre was redefined in terms of the wavelength of the orange-red line of krypton-86. The current definition of the metre is "the length of the path travelled by light in vacuum during a time interval of 1/ of a second".

On 16 November 2018, the 26th General Conference on Weights and Measures (CGPM) voted unanimously in favour of revised definitions of some SI base units, in particular the kilogram. The new definitions came into force on 20 May 2019, but do not change the metre.

International organization
The Convention created an international organization with three organs to facilitate the standardization of weights and measures around the world. The first, the CGPM provides a forum for representative of member states, the second, the CIPM is an advisory committee of metrologists of high standing and the third, is the secretariat that provides appropriate meeting and laboratory facilities in support of the CGPM and CIPM.

The structure may be compared to a corporation. The CIPM is the board of directors, and the CGPM is the shareholders' meeting.

General Conference on Weights and Measures
The General Conference on Weights and Measures ( or CGPM) is the principal decision-making body put on place by the convention. It is made up of delegates from member states and [non-voting] observers from associate states and economies. The conference usually meets every four years to receive and discuss a report from the CIPM and to endorse new developments in the SI on the advice of the CIPM though at the 2011 meeting, it agreed to meet again in 2014 rather than 2015 to discuss the maturity of the new SI proposals. It is also responsible for new appointments to the CIPM and decides on major issues concerning the development and financing of the BIPM. According to the Metre Convention (Art. 4) the President of the French Academy of Sciences is also the President of the General Conference on Weights and Measures.

International Committee for Weights and Measures

The International Committee for Weights and Measures ( or CIPM) is made up of eighteen (originally fourteen) individuals from a member state of high scientific standing, nominated by the CGPM to advise the CGPM on administrative and technical matters. It is responsible for the running of ten consultative committees (CCs), each of which investigates different aspects of metrology – one CC discusses the measurement of temperature, another the measurement of mass and so on. The CIPM meets annually at Saint-Cloud to discuss annual reports from the various CCs, to submit an annual report to the governments of member states in respect of the administration and finances of the BIPM and to advise the CGPM on technical matters as and when necessary. Each member of the CIPM is from a different member state – with France, in recognition of its work in setting up the convention, always having one seat on the CIPM.

Secretariat of the BIPM
The Secretariat of the International Bureau of Weights and Measures ( or BIPM) is based at Saint-Cloud, France. It has custody of the now historical international prototype of the kilogram and provides metrology services for the CGPM and CIPM, and hosts their formal meetings. It also has custody of the former international prototype of the metre which was retired in 1960. Over the years the various prototypes of the metre and of the kilogram were returned to BIPM headquarters for recalibration services.

Initially it had a staff of 9, falling to 4 once the initial batch of prototypes had been distributed; in 2012 it had a staff of over 70 people and an annual budget of over €10 million. The director of the BIPM is ex-officio a member of the CIPM and a member of all consultative committees.

Headquarters, language and protocol

The original treaty was written in French and the authoritative language of all official documents is French. Communication between the BIPM and member states is, in the case of France, via the French Foreign Minister and in the case of all other members, via the members' ambassador to France.

The French government offered the treaty members the Pavillon de Breteuil in Saint-Cloud to house the BIPM. The Pavillon was originally built in 1675 on the estate of the Château de Saint-Cloud and was home to, amongst others, Emperor Napoleon III. The château was all but destroyed during the Franco-Prussian War (1870–1) and the Pavillon badly damaged. The Pavillon has been fully restored and, as headquarters of an intergovernmental organization enjoys privileges and immunities.

Post-1875 developments
The science of metrology has progressed vastly since 1875. In particular the treaty was amended in 1921 with the result that many other international organizations have a forum within the CIPM to ensure harmonization of measurement standards across many disciplines. In addition, what were originally conceived as standards for the purposes of trade have now been extended to cover a large number of aspects of human activity including medicine, science, engineering and technology.

Extensions to the treaty (1921) and development of SI

The metre convention was originally drawn up with the main purpose of providing a standards of length and mass only.  Standards relating to other quantities were under the control of other bodies – time was measured by astronomers, electrical units by a series of ad-hoc international conferences, and other physical standards and concepts were maintained or defined by international bodies such as International Congress of Applied Chemistry or the International Union of Pure and Applied Physics.

In 1901 Giorgi published a proposal for building a coherent set of units based on four base units – the metre, kilogram, second and one electrical unit (ampere, volt or ohm). In 1921 the convention was extended to permit the promotion of standards relating to any physical quantity which greatly increased the scope of the CIPM's remit and implicitly giving it freedom to exploit Giorgi's proposals. The 8th CGPM (1933) resolved to work with other international bodies to agree standards for electrical units that could be related back to the international prototypes. This was agreed in principle by the International Electrotechnical Commission at its congress in Brussels in 1935 subject to the choice of the fourth unit being agreed with, amongst others, the appropriate consultative committee of the CIPM.

In 1948, three years after the end of the Second World War and fifteen years after the 8th CGPM, the 9th CGPM was convened. In response to formal requests made by the International Union of Pure and Applied Physics and by the French Government to establish a practical system of units of measure, the CGPM requested the CIPM to prepare recommendations for a single practical system of units of measurement, suitable for adoption by all countries adhering to the Metre Convention. At the same time the CGPM formally adopted a recommendation for the writing and printing of unit symbols and of numbers. The recommendation also catalogued the recommended symbols for the most important MKS and CGS units of measure and for the first time the CGPM made recommendations concerning derived units.

The CIPM's draft proposal, which was an extensive revision and simplification of the metric unit definitions, symbols and terminology based on the MKS system of units, was put to the 10th CGPM in 1954. In the proposal the CIPM recommended that the ampere be the base unit from which electromechanical standards would be derived. After negotiations with the CIS and IUPAP, two further base units, the degree kelvin and the candela were also proposed as base units. The full system and name "Système international d'unités" were adopted at the 11th CGPM.

The formal definition of International System of Units (SI) along with the associated resolutions passed by the CGPM and the CIPM are published by the BIPM on the Internet and in brochure form at regular intervals. The eighth edition of the brochure Le Système international d'unités – The International System of Units was published in 2006.

MRA programme

During the 1940s, the United States government recognized the benefits of its suppliers keeping quality control records in respect of manufactured goods that would provide traceability of the process. This process was formalized by the British Government and in 1979 as the quality control standard BS 5750. In 1987 BS 5750 was adopted by ISO as the basis for ISO 9000. ISO 9000 is a general purpose quality control standard which works in conjunction industry-specific standards: for example ISO 15195:2003 which gives the specific requirements for reference measurement laboratories in laboratory medicine.

International trade is hampered by one country not recognising the quality controls in place in other countries – often due to standards being different or being incompatible with each other. At the 20th CGPM (1995), it was recognized that although ad-hoc recognition of instrument calibration between cooperating countries had been taking place for a hundred years, a need had arisen for a more comprehensive agreement. Consequently, the CIPM was mandated to investigate the setting up of a Mutual Recognition Agreement in respect of instrument calibration. Any such agreement would require the keeping of records that could demonstrate the traceability of calibrations back to the base standards. Such records would be recorded within an ISO 9000 framework. Four years later, in 1999 the text of the CIPM-MRA was agreed at the 21st CGPM.

The CIPM-MRA scheme is to catalogue the capabilities of National Measurement Institutes (NMIs) such as NIST in the United States or the National Physical Laboratory in Britain whose calibration procedures have been peer-assessed. The essential points of CIPM-MRA are:
The agreement is only open to countries that have signed the Metre Convention, either as full or as associate members.
A country may have more than one NMI, though only one NMI is chosen as the signatory organization.
The measurement capabilities of NMI's will be peer-reviewed at regular intervals and each NMI will recognize the measurement capabilities of other NMIs.
The BIPM maintains a publicly available database of the measurement capabilities of each NMI.
NMI's

Subsequent to launch of the CIPM MRA and in response to a European Community directive on  medical devices, the Joint Committee for Traceability in Laboratory Medicine (JCTLM) was created in 2002 through a Declaration of Cooperation between the International Committee of Weights and Measures (CIPM), the International Federation of Clinical Chemistry and Laboratory Medicine (IFCC), and the International Laboratory Accreditation Cooperation (ILAC). The joint committee provides a forum for the harmonization of standards of the various participants.

Coordination of International Atomic Time
With the advent of the atomic clock it has been possible to define and measure International Atomic Time with sufficient precision that variations in the Earth's rotation can be detected. The International Earth Rotation Service monitors these changes relative to the stars at regular intervals and proposes leap seconds as and when these are needed. Currently there are over 200 atomic clocks in over 50 national laboratories around the world and the BIPM, in terms of the mandate given to it under the Metre Convention, coordinates the various atomic clocks.

New SI

After 1960, when the definition of the metre was linked to a particular wavelength of light rather than the international prototype of the metre, the only unit of measure that remained dependent on a particular artefact was the kilogram. Over the years, small drifts which could be as high as  kilograms per annum in the mass of the international prototype of the kilogram were detected. At the 21st meeting of the CGPM (1999), national laboratories were urged to investigate ways of breaking the link between the kilogram and a specific artefact.

Independently of this drift having been identified, the Avogadro project and development of the Kibble (or watt) balance promised methods of indirectly measuring mass with a very high precision. These projects provided tools that enabled alternative means of redefining the kilogram.

A report published in 2007 by the Consultative Committee for Thermometry to the CIPM noted that their definition of temperature had proved to be unsatisfactory for temperatures below 20 K and for temperatures above 1300 K. The committee was of the view that the Boltzmann constant provided a better basis for temperature measurement than did the triple point of water, as it overcame these difficulties.

Over the next few years the support for natural constants grew and details were clarified, until in November 2018, the 26th General Conference on Weights and Measures voted unanimously in favour of revised definitions of the SI base units. The 2019 redefinition of the SI base units came into force on the 144th anniversary of the convention, 20 May 2019.

Membership
The CGPM recognizes two classes of membership – full membership for those states that wish to participate in the activities of the BIPM and associate membership for those countries or economies that only wish to participate in the MRA programme. Associate members have observer status at the CGPM. Since all formal liaison between the convention organizations and national governments is handled by the member state's ambassador to France, it is implicit that member states must have diplomatic relations with France, though during both world wars, nations that were at war with France retained their membership of the CGPM. The opening session of each CGPM is chaired by the French foreign minister and subsequent sessions by the president of the French Academy of Sciences.

On 20 May 1875 representatives from seventeen of countries that attended the Conference of the Metre in 1875, signed the Convention of the Metre. In April 1884 HJ Chaney, Warden of Standards in London unofficially contacted the BIPM inquiring whether the BIPM would calibrate some metre standards that had been manufactured in Britain. Broch, director of the BIPM replied that he was not authorized to perform any such calibrations for non-member states. On 17 September 1884, the British Government signed the convention. This number grew to 21 in 1900, 32 in 1950, and 49 in 2001. , the General Conference membership was made up of 62 member states, 40 associate states and economies and four international organizations as follows (with year of partnership between brackets):

Member states

Associates
At its 21st meeting (October 1999), the CGPM created the category of "associate" for those states not yet members of the BIPM and for economic unions.

International organizations
The following international organizations have signed the CIPM MRA:
International Atomic Energy Agency (IAEA), Vienna, Austria (1999)
Institute for Reference Materials and Measurements (IRMM), Geel, Belgium (1999)
World Meteorological Organization (WMO), Geneva, Switzerland (2010)
European Space Agency (ESA), Paris, France (2012)

Former member states
The following former members were excluded from the organization following failure to pay their arrears over a span of years and upon failing to provide any form of payment plan:

Cameroon was a member state from 1970 until 22 October 2012.
North Korea was a member state from 1982 until 2012
Dominican Republic was a member state from 1954 until 31 December 2014.
Venezuela was a member state from 1879 until 14 November 2018.
Yemen was an associate from 21 July 2014 until 1 January 2018.
Zimbabwe was an associate from 14 September 2010 until 1 January 2021.

See also
 Metrication
History of the metre
Seconds pendulum
World Metrology Day

Notes

References

Further reading
 
 Kershaw, Michael. "The ‘nec plus ultra’ of precision measurement: Geodesy and the forgotten purpose of the Metre Convention." Studies in History and Philosophy of Science Part A 43.4 (2012): 563-576. online
 Quinn, Terry. "The Metre Convention and world-wide comparability of measurement results." Accreditation and quality assurance 9.9 (2004): 533–538.
 Stigler, S. The History of Statistics: The Measurement of Uncertainty before 1900 (1986).

External links

Text of the current version of the Convention (in French with unofficial translation in English at the end)
Text in English, Library of Congress
Text of the CIPM-MRA agreement

Measurement
Metrology
Metric system
International System of Units
Metrication in France
1875 in France
1875 treaties
Treaties of Argentina
Treaties of Australia
Treaties of Austria-Hungary
Treaties of Belgium
Treaties of the First Brazilian Republic
Treaties of the Kingdom of Bulgaria
Treaties of Canada
Treaties of Chile
Treaties of the People's Republic of China
Treaties of Colombia
Treaties of Croatia
Treaties of the Czech Republic
Treaties of Czechoslovakia
Treaties of Denmark
Treaties of the Dominican Republic
Treaties of Egypt
Treaties of Finland
Treaties of the French Third Republic
Treaties of the German Empire
Treaties of Greece
Treaties of India
Treaties of Indonesia
Treaties of Pahlavi Iran
Treaties of the Irish Free State
Treaties of Israel
Treaties of the Kingdom of Italy (1861–1946)
Treaties of the Empire of Japan
Treaties of Kazakhstan
Treaties of Kenya
Treaties of Malaysia
Treaties of Mexico
Treaties of the Netherlands
Treaties of New Zealand
Treaties of the Kingdom of Hungary (1920–1946)
Treaties of Pakistan
Treaties of the Second Polish Republic
Treaties of the Kingdom of Portugal
Treaties of the Kingdom of Romania
Treaties of the Russian Empire
Treaties of Saudi Arabia
Treaties of Serbia and Montenegro
Treaties of Singapore
Treaties of Slovakia
Treaties of South Africa
Treaties of South Korea
Treaties of Spain under the Restoration
Treaties of Switzerland
Treaties of Thailand
Treaties of Tunisia
Treaties of the Ottoman Empire
Treaties of the United Kingdom (1801–1922)
Treaties of the United Kingdoms of Sweden and Norway
Treaties of the United States
Treaties of Uruguay
Treaties of Venezuela
Treaties establishing intergovernmental organizations
May 1875 events
Metrication